Planisticus is a genus of beetles in the family Cerambycidae, containing the following species:

 Planisticus breuningi Vives, 2004
 Planisticus latesulcatus (Fairmaire, 1887)
 Planisticus nivosus (Fairmaire, 1893)

References

Dorcasominae